The Dashman Nature Reserve is located in Bazar-Korgon District of Jalal-Abad Region of Kyrgyzstan. It was established in 1975 as a forest reserve with a purpose of conservation of natural forests composed of walnut trees (Juglans regia), apple trees (Malus spp), alycha (Prunus divaricata) and other species. It was converted to a stricter nature reserve in 2012. The nature reserve occupies . It lies within the Arstanbap rural community.

References

Nature reserves in Kyrgyzstan
Protected areas established in 1975